Progressive rod-cone degeneration is a protein in humans that is encoded by the PRCD gene.

This gene is predominantly expressed in the retina, and mutations in this gene are the cause of autosomal recessive retinal degeneration in both humans and dogs. Alternatively spliced transcript variants have been found for this gene. [provided by RefSeq, Mar 2010].

References

Further reading 

Genes on human chromosome 17